Xuanzang Temple is a Buddhist temple located within  , in Xuanwu District, Nanjing, Jiangsu, China.

History
In the early winter of 1942, the occupying Imperial Japanese Army dug a stone envelope at the ruins of Sanzang Pagoda at Great Bao'en Temple which contained the Śarīra of the Tang dynasty (618–907) eminent monk Xuanzang. In early 1943, the Wang Jingwei government built a brick tower to worship the Śarīra of Xuanzang, which was named Sanzang Pagoda.

Xuanzang Temple was built by the Xuanwu District Government in 2003 in memory of eminent Buddhist monk Xuanzang of the Tang dynasty. , a leader of Qixia Temple, was proposed as abbot of the temple.

In 2004, Xuanzang Temple was designated as a National Patriotism Education Demonstration Base by the Nanjing Municipal People's Government.

Gallery

References

Buddhist temples in Nanjing
Tourist attractions in Nanjing
2003 establishments in China
21st-century Buddhist temples
Religious buildings and structures completed in 2003